Leahy is an unincorporated community in Douglas County, Washington, United States.

References

Unincorporated communities in Douglas County, Washington
Unincorporated communities in Washington (state)